Robert Kincaid Brock (May 29, 1878 – November 18, 1962) was an American Democratic politician who served twice as a member of the Virginia Senate, from 1912 to 1916 and again from 1936 to 1948.

References

External links
 
 

1878 births
1962 deaths
Democratic Party Virginia state senators
20th-century American politicians
People from Buckingham County, Virginia